Between 1957 and 1959, there were 79 Thor missiles launched, of which 51 were successful, giving a 64.5% success rate.

Launch statistics

Rocket configurations

Launch sites

Launch outcomes

1957
There were 9 Thor missiles launched in 1957. 4 of the 9 launches were successful, giving a 44.4% success rate.

1958
There were 20 Thor missiles launched in 1958. 8 of the 20 launches were successful, giving a 40% success rate.

1959
There were 50 Thor missiles launched in 1959. 39 of the 50 launches were successful, giving a 78% success rate.

Images

See also

Lists of Thor and Delta launches
Lists of Thor launches